Sven Henriksen (1890-1935) was a Danish poster artist. He was the only artist in the Golden Age of Danish poster art who exclusively worked with poster design.

Biography
Sven Henriksen began his career as a poster artist in circa 1910 after feaduating from Copenhagen Technival College and completing an aprentership as a painter. He was also active as an exhibition organizer and created numerous posters for his owns exhibitions.

He died from sepsis at the peak of his career after hurting himself on a nail in his studio.

Style
Sven Henriksen was influenced by German poster art. His posters are characterized by simple compositions with strong, striking colours.

Gallery

References

External links

 Source

1890 births
1935 deaths
Danish poster artists
Deaths from sepsis